The Changan CS95 is a mid-size crossover SUV produced by Changan Automobile. It was previewed by a pre-production show car on the 2016 Beijing Auto Show.

Overview
The production version of the Changan CS95 SUV for China was unveiled on the 2016 Guangzhou Auto Show, with the launch on the Chinese auto market in 2017. Despite the name, it was a completely different vehicle to the Changan CS95 Concept revealed in Auto Shanghai 2013. Pricing ranges from 159,800 yuan to 229,800 yuan ($23,185 – 33,342 USD). The CS95 is the largest passenger car under the Changan product range. The only gearbox available is six-speed automatic and equipped with Changan’s NexTrac AWD system. The Changan CS95 has faced criticism for resembling the Land Rover Discovery L462 regarding its styling.

2018 facelift
A facelift was revealed in 2018 featuring the latest Changan family DRG with connected tail lamps in the rear. The powertrain of the s018 facelift model remains to be the same.

References

External links

 

CS95
2010s cars
2020s cars
Cars of China
Cars introduced in 2017
Mid-size sport utility vehicles
Crossover sport utility vehicles
Front-wheel-drive vehicles
All-wheel-drive vehicles